"Boogie Body Land" is a song written by the band members of the Bar-Kays. It was released in 1980 by Mercury Records. "Boogie Body Land" was included in their 1980 album As One which was produced by Allen Jones. As a single it peaked at number 7 on the Billboard Black Singles and number 73 on the Dance chart. Lowest position was 74 on the latter.

Track listing

1980 releases  
7" vinyl
 US: Mercury / 45-76088

Personnel 
 Performer: Bar-Kays
 Songwriters: Allen Jones, Charles Allen, Frank Thompson, Harvey Henderson, James Alexander, Larry Dodson, Lloyd Smith, Mark Bynum, Michael Beard, Sherman Guy, Winston Stewart

Chart performance

References 

1980 singles
1980 songs
Mercury Records singles